Křetín is a municipality and village in Blansko District in the South Moravian Region of the Czech Republic. It has about 500 inhabitants.

Administrative parts
The village of Dolní Poříčí is an administrative part of Křetín.

References

Villages in Blansko District